Zuranolone (developmental code names SAGE-217, S-812217) is an investigational medication which is under development by SAGE Therapeutics for the treatment of depressive disorders and a variety of other indications. It is a synthetic, orally active, inhibitory pregnane neurosteroid, and acts as a positive allosteric modulator of the GABAA receptor. The drug was developed as an improvement of brexanolone (allopregnanolone) with high oral bioavailability and a biological half-life suitable for once-daily administration. Its half-life is around 16 to 23hours, compared to approximately 9hours for brexanolone. As of December 2022, zuranolone is in preregistration for major depressive disorder and postpartum depression, phase III clinical trials for insomnia, and phase II clinical studies for bipolar depression, essential tremor, and Parkinson's disease. Zuranolone was also under investigation for treatment of dyskinesias and seizures, but no further development has been reported for these indications.

See also 
 List of investigational antidepressants
 List of investigational sleep drugs
 List of neurosteroids

References

External links 
 Zuranolone - AdisInsight

5β-Pregnanes
Alcohols
Anticonvulsants
Antidepressants
Experimental drugs
GABAA receptor positive allosteric modulators
Ketones
Neurosteroids
Nitriles
Pyrazoles